BW Plantation is an Indonesian company active in oil palm plantations and 
palm oil manufacturing. 
Despite risen sales, its profits plunged in 2013. 
BW Plantation has 89,000 hectares of plantations in Central Kalimantan, 
East Kalimantan and West Kalimantan.
 Abdul Halim Ashari is its President Director. 
It has four palm oil mills in Central Kalimantan. 
It is based in Jakarta. Its subsidiaries include PT Bumilanggeng Perdanatrada, PT Adhyaksa Dharmasatya, PT Sawit Sukses Sejahtera, PT Wana Catur Jaya Utama, PT Satria Manunggal Sejahtera and PT Agrolestari Kencana Makmur.
It had its initial public offering in 2009. 

A subsidiary of BW Plantation has cleared forest habitat of the orangutan.

References

Palm oil companies of Indonesia